Burmann or Bürmann is a surname. Notable people with the surname include:

 Gottlob Burmann (1737–1805), German poet and lipogrammatist
 Pieter Burmann the Younger (1714–1778), Dutch philologist 
 Pieter Burmann the Elder (1668–1741), Dutch classical scholar
 Hans Heinrich Bürmann (died 1817), German mathematician
 Sigfrido Burmann (1891–1980), Spanish art director
 Wilhelm Burmann (1939-2020), German dancer
 Wolfgang Burmann (born 1940), Spanish art director

See also
 Burman
 Buurman